Misplaced is a 1989 English-language Polish-American film directed by Louis Yansen. Swedish actress Viveca Lindfors and John Cameron Mitchell play a Polish mother and her teenage son who immigrate to America for political reasons in 1981.

Cast
Viveca Lindfors	 Zofia
John Cameron Mitchell her son Jacek
Elżbieta Czyżewska Halina
Kellie Overbey, Mary
Tico Wells Clayton
Scott Schutzman Tiler, Eric  
Thor Fields ruffian's friend
Paul Klementowicz, Polish policeman
Olek Krupa Jacek's father
Deirdre O'Connell  Ella
Debralee Scott schoolteacher
Sullivan Walker
Mark Patton roughneck

References

1989 films
Polish drama films